Pleasure EP was the first release by rock band Semisonic.  It was originally released in 1995 and later re-released following the success of their song "Closing Time". The title refers to the band's original name, Pleasure.

Track listing
"The Prize" – 3:54	 
"Brand New Baby" – 3:31	 
"In The Veins" – 3:48 	 
"Wishing Well" – 4:40 	 
"Star" – 3:43	 
"Sculpture Garden" – 2:49	 	
"Drum Lesson" – 0:20	 	
"The Gift" – 2:37	 	
"We Should Listen" – 0:09 	 	
"Blank" – 0:09 	 	
"Broth/Twister Clock" – 0:17	 	
"Baby Loop/Forest Skulls" – 0:22	 	
"Pure Milk Genius" – 0:04 	
"Moaner/Star Filter" – 0:24

Personnel

Semisonic
John Munson – bass guitar
Jacob Slichter – drums
Dan Wilson – lead vocals, guitar, design

Technical personnel
Daniel Corrigan – photography
Dan Hersch – mastering
Brad Kern – engineering, mixing

References

1995 debut EPs
Semisonic EPs
CherryDisc Records EPs